Tourist Studies is a triannual peer-reviewed academic journal that covers studies on tourism. Its editors-in-chief are Gordon Waitt (University of Wollongong) and Caroline Scarles (University of Surrey). Tim Edensor is an Editor Emeritus. The journal was established in 2001 and is published by SAGE Publications.

Abstracting and indexing 
The journal is abstracted and indexed in:
 Academic Premier
 Scopus

References

External links 
 

SAGE Publishing academic journals
English-language journals
Triannual journals
Publications established in 2001
Sociology journals